Dioscorea trilinguis is a climbing tuberous geophyte in the family Dioscoreaceae. It is native to southeastern Brazil (Bahia, Rio de Janeiro, São Paulo), and is found growing in tropical forests, dry forests, and on clay soil.

References

trilinguis